Shortly after the end of the First World War, the German Kaiserliche Marine was scuttled by its sailors while held off the harbor of the British Royal Navy base at Scapa Flow, in the Orkney Islands of Scotland. The High Seas Fleet was interned there under the terms of the Armistice while negotiations took place over the fate of the ships. Fearing that either the UK would seize the ships unilaterally or the German government at the time might reject the Treaty of Versailles and resume the war effort (in which case the ships could be used against Germany), Admiral Ludwig von Reuter decided to scuttle the fleet.

The scuttling was carried out on 21 June 1919. Intervening British guard ships were able to beach some of the ships, but 52 of the 74 interned vessels sank. Many of the wrecks were salvaged over the next two decades and were towed away for scrapping. Those that remain are popular diving sites. The ships are a source of low-background steel.

Background 

The signing of the Armistice on 11 November 1918, at Compiègne, France, effectively ended the First World War. The Allied powers agreed that Germany's U-boat fleet should be surrendered without the possibility of return, but were unable to agree upon a course of action regarding the German surface fleet. The Americans suggested that the ships be interned in a neutral port until a final decision was reached, but the two countries that were approached – Norway and Spain – both refused. Admiral Rosslyn Wemyss suggested that the fleet be interned at Scapa Flow with a skeleton crew of German sailors, and guarded in the interim by the Grand Fleet.

The terms were transmitted to Germany on 12 November 1918, instructing them to make the High Seas Fleet ready to sail by 18 November, or the Allies would occupy Heligoland.

On the night of 15 November, Rear-Admiral Hugo Meurer, the representative of Admiral Franz von Hipper, met Admiral David Beatty aboard Beatty's flagship, . Beatty presented Meurer with the terms, which were expanded at a second meeting the following day. The U-boats were to surrender to Rear-Admiral Reginald Tyrwhitt at Harwich, under the supervision of the Harwich Force. The surface fleet was to sail to the Firth of Forth and surrender to Beatty. They would then be led to Scapa Flow and interned, pending the outcome of the peace negotiations. Meurer asked for an extension to the deadline, aware that the sailors were still in a mutinous mood (which earlier had led to the Wilhelmshaven mutiny), and that the officers might have difficulty in getting them to obey orders. Meurer eventually signed the terms after midnight.

Surrender of the fleet 

The first craft to be surrendered were the U-boats, which began to arrive at Harwich on 20 November 1918; 176 were eventually handed over. Hipper refused to lead his fleet to the surrender, delegating the task to Rear-Admiral Ludwig von Reuter. The German fleet was met by the light cruiser  on the morning of 21 November, and led to the rendezvous with over 370 ships of the Grand Fleet and other allied navies. There were 70 German ships in total; the battleship  and the light cruiser  had engine trouble and had to be left behind. The destroyer  struck a mine while crossing, and sank.

The German ships were escorted into the Firth of Forth, where they anchored. Beatty signalled them:

The German flag will be hauled down at sunset today and will not be hoisted again without permission. 

The fleet was then moved between 25 and 27 November to Scapa Flow; the destroyers to Gutter Sound and the battleships and cruisers to the north and west of the island of Cava. Eventually, a total of 74 ships were interned there, König and Dresden having arrived on 6 December accompanied by the destroyer , which replaced the sunken V30. The last ship to arrive was the battleship  on 9 January 1919. Initially, the interned ships were guarded by the Battle Cruiser Force (later reduced to the Battle Cruiser Squadron), commanded in succession by Vice-Admiral William Pakenham, Rear-Admiral Henry Oliver and Rear-Admiral Roger Keyes. On 1 May 1919, Vice-Admiral Sir Arthur Leveson and the Second Battle Squadron of the Atlantic Fleet took over guard duties, and were succeeded on 18 May by Vice-Admiral Sir Sydney Fremantle and the First Battle Squadron.

In captivity 

The naval historian Arthur Marder described the state of affairs on board the German ships during the internment as "one of complete demoralization". He identified four reasons that exacerbated the situation: lack of discipline, poor food, lack of recreation and slow postal service.  The cumulative result of these problems created "indescribable filth in some of the ships". On 29 November the Second-in-Command of the Grand Fleet, Admiral Sir Charles Madden, wrote to his brother-in-law and former superior Lord Jellicoe that, "All proposed orders are considered and counter-signed by the men's committee before they are executed and then they are carried out as convenient". When visiting an interned ship the German officers were reported to have been "dumb with shame". Food was sent from Germany twice a month but was monotonous and not of good quality. Catching fish and seagulls provided a dietary supplement and some recreation. A large amount of brandy was also sent over. Recreation for the men was limited to their ships, as the British refused to allow any of the interned sailors to go ashore or visit any other German ships. British officers and men were only allowed to visit on official business. Outgoing post to Germany was censored from the beginning, and later incoming post also. German seamen were granted 300 cigarettes a month or 75 cigars. There were German doctors in the interned fleet but no dentists, and the British refused to provide dental care.

Command of the interned ships was exercised through Reuter, flying his flag in the battleship . He had a British drifter at his disposal for visiting ships and issuing written orders on urgent business, and his staff was occasionally allowed to visit other ships to arrange repatriation of officers and men. Reuter, whose health was poor, requested that his flag be transferred to the light cruiser  on 25 March after he was repeatedly prevented from sleeping by the stomping on his cabin roof by a group of revolutionary sailors called the "Red Guard". Over seven months the number of men in his command was continually reduced from the 20,000 men who had sailed the ships over in November. Four thousand returned to Germany on 3 December, 6,000 on 6 December and 5,000 on 12 December, leaving 4,815, of whom approximately 100 were repatriated a month.

Negotiations over the fate of the ships were under way at the Paris Peace Conference. The French and Italians each wanted a quarter of the ships. The British wanted them destroyed, since they knew that any redistribution would be detrimental to the proportional advantage in numbers they had compared to other navies. Under Article XXXI of the Armistice the Germans were not permitted to destroy their ships. Both Admirals Beatty and Madden had approved plans to seize the German ships in case scuttling was attempted; Admirals Keyes and Leveson recommended that the ships be seized anyway and the crews interned ashore at Nigg Island, but their suggestions were not taken up. Their concern was not without justification, for as early as January 1919, Reuter mentioned the possibility of scuttling the fleet to his chief of staff. Having learned of the possible terms of the Treaty of Versailles in May 1919, he began to prepare detailed plans to scuttle his ships. Admiral Erich Raeder later wrote that Reuter was informed that the fleet was to be scuttled at all costs. A further reduction of crews with the departure of two transports to Germany on 18 June 1919 meant that Reuter was left with reliable men to carry out preparations. On that day he sent out orders, paragraph 11 of which stated: "It is my intention to sink the ships only if the enemy should attempt to obtain possession of them without the assent of our government. Should our government agree in the peace to terms to the surrender of the ships, then the ships will be handed over, to the lasting disgrace of those who have placed us in this position." His orders were sent to the interned ships on 18 June.

In the meantime the signing of the Treaty of Versailles was scheduled for noon on 21 June 1919. The First Battle Squadron prepared to board the German ships in force to check for signs that the fleet was preparing to scuttle. On 13 June Admiral Madden requested in person at the Admiralty a daily political appreciation from 17 June onwards so as to be prepared to take action, but as Madden related to Beatty shortly afterwards, "they had no reliable indication of the German attitude towards the peace terms". Admiral Fremantle submitted to Madden on 16 June a scheme for seizing the German ships at midnight of 21/22 June, after the treaty was meant to be signed. Madden approved the plan on 19 June, but only after he was informed that the deadline for signing the treaty was extended to 19:00 on 23 June and he neglected to officially inform Fremantle. News of the extension was seen by Fremantle in a newspaper on the same day and he assumed it to be true. He had been under orders from Madden for some time to exercise his battleships against torpedo attacks, which required good weather in order to recover the torpedoes. The weather on the night of 20 June was favourable so Fremantle ordered the First Battle Squadron to sea at 09:00 the next day, 21 June. The operation to seize the German ships was postponed until the night of his squadron's return to Scapa Flow on 23 June, after the deadline to sign the treaty had expired. Fremantle later claimed that before he left Scapa he had unofficially informed Reuter that the armistice was still in effect.

The fleet is scuttled 

Around 10:00 a.m. on 21 June 1919, Reuter sent a flag signal ordering the fleet to stand by for the signal to scuttle. At about 11:20 the flag signal was sent: "To all Commanding Officers and the Leader of the Torpedo Boats. Paragraph Eleven of to-day's date. Acknowledge. Chief of the Interned Squadron." The signal was repeated by semaphore and searchlights. Scuttling began immediately: seacocks and flood valves were opened, internal water pipes smashed and drain valves on sewage tanks opened. Portholes had already been loosened, watertight doors and condenser covers left open, and in some ships holes had been bored through bulkheads, all to facilitate the spread of water once scuttling began. One German ship commander recorded that before 21 June, seacocks had been set on a hair turning and heavily lubricated, while large hammers had been placed besides valves.

There was no noticeable effect until noon, when Friedrich der Grosse began to list heavily to starboard and all the ships hoisted the Imperial German Ensign at their mainmasts. The crews then began to abandon ship. The British naval forces left at Scapa Flow comprised three destroyers, one of which was under repair, seven trawlers and a number of drifters. Fremantle started receiving news of the scuttling at 12:20 and cancelled his squadron's exercise at 12:35, steaming at full speed back to Scapa Flow. He and a division of ships arrived at 14:30 in time to see only the large ships still afloat. He had radioed ahead to order all available craft to prevent the German ships sinking or beach them. The last German ship to sink was the battlecruiser  at 17:00, by which time 15 capital ships were sunk, and only  survived. Five light cruisers and 32 destroyers were also sunk. Nine German sailors were shot and killed and about 16 wounded aboard their lifeboats rowing towards land.

During the afternoon, 1,774 Germans were picked up and transported by battleships of the First Battle Squadron to Invergordon. Fremantle had sent out a general order declaring that the Germans were to be treated as prisoners-of-war for having broken the armistice and they were destined for the prisoner-of-war camps at Nigg. Admiral Fremantle subsequently remarked privately, "I could not resist feeling some sympathy for von Reuter, who had preserved his dignity when placed against his will in a highly unpleasant and invidious position."

Reactions 

The French were disappointed that the German fleet was gone, having hoped to acquire at least some of the ships. Admiral Wemyss privately remarked:

Admiral Reinhard Scheer declared:

Aftermath 

Of the 74 German ships at Scapa Flow, 15 of the 16 capital ships, 5 of the 8 cruisers, and 32 of the 50 destroyers were sunk. The remainder either remained afloat, or were towed to shallower waters and beached. The beached ships were later dispersed to the allied navies, but most of the sunken ships were initially left at the bottom of Scapa Flow, the cost of salvaging them being deemed to be not worth the potential returns, owing to the glut of scrap metal left after the end of the war, with plenty of obsolete warships having been broken up. After complaints from locals that the wrecks were a hazard to navigation, a salvage company was formed in 1923, which raised four of the sunken destroyers.

At about this time, the entrepreneur Ernest Cox became involved. He began operations to refloat the destroyers using an old German dry dock he purchased and subsequently modified. He was able to lift 24 of his 26 destroyers over the next year and a half, after which he began work on the larger vessels. He developed a new salvage technique whereby divers patched the holes in the submerged hulls, and pumped air into them to displace the water, letting them rise to the surface where they could then be towed to the breakers. Using this technique, he refloated several of the ships. His methods were costly, however, and the final cost of raising Hindenburg ran to some £30,000 (equivalent to £ in ). Industrial action and a coal strike in 1926 nearly brought operations to a halt, but Cox instead dug out the coal in the submerged Seydlitz, using it to power his machines until the end of the strike. Salvaging Seydlitz also proved difficult, as the ship sank again during the first attempt to raise her, wrecking most of the salvage equipment. Undaunted, Cox tried again, ordering that when she was next raised, news cameras would be there to capture him witnessing the moment. The plan nearly backfired when Seydlitz was accidentally refloated while Cox was holidaying in Switzerland. Cox told the workers to sink her again, then returned to Scotland to be present as Seydlitz was duly refloated a third time. Cox's company eventually raised 26 destroyers, two battlecruisers and five battleships. Cox sold his remaining interests to the Alloa Shipbreaking Company (later Metal Industries Group) and retired as the "man who bought a navy". The latter company went on to raise a further five cruisers, battlecruisers and battleships, before the outbreak of the Second World War brought operations to a halt.

They have changed ownership several times and minor salvage is still carried out to recover small pieces of steel. This low-background steel is used in the manufacture of radiation-sensitive devices, such as Geiger counters, as it is not contaminated with radioisotopes, having been produced before any chance of nuclear contamination. In 2001, the seven wrecks that remain were scheduled under the Ancient Monuments and Archaeological Areas Act 1979 (as SM9298 & SM9308). Divers are allowed to visit them but need a permit to do so.

The scrap from the raised ships were sold, with Nazi Germany using purchased scrap to construct the first ships and U-boats for the Kriegsmarine.

While the rebuilding of the German Army in the 1930s was based upon the combined myths of "invincibility on the battlefield" and the "stab in the back", the attitude and actions of the High Seas Fleet at Scapa Flow became a symbol of defiance for the new recruits and officers of the Kriegsmarine. The last living military witness to the scuttling of the fleet was Claude Choules, who died on 5 May 2011 aged 110.  Choules was the last known living combat veteran of the First World War. An eyewitness account of the scuttling and the subsequent angry meeting between Reuter and Fremantle was published in 2015 by the family of Hugh David, who died in 1957. In 2019, the three battleships Markgraf, König and Kronprinz Wilhelm were sold on eBay (by the retiring diving contractor Tommy Clark) for £25,500 each to a Middle Eastern company. The cruiser, Karlsruhe, sold for £8,500 to a private bidder in England.

Centenary anniversary event 

Two remembrance ceremonies took place on Friday 21 June 2019 to mark the 100th anniversary of the scuttling of the German High Seas Fleet. The grandson, and three great grandsons of von Reuter attended both services. The morning 'Reflection at Sea' service was held in the middle of the Flow at 11.00 and was attended by dive charter vessels, the Orkney Ferries vessel Thorsvoe, Longhope Lifeboat and two ships from the Northern Lighthouse Board, Pharos and Polestar. The second ceremony was held at Lyness in the Royal Naval Cemetery by the graves of WWI German sailors.

In popular culture 

The circumstances of the event as well as computer generated 'scans' of the remaining scuttled ships on the seabed featured in an episode of the National Geographic documentary Drain the Oceans.

Kris Drever's song "Scapa Flow 1919" explores the events from a German sailor's viewpoint.

List of ships

See also 

 Scuttling of the Peruvian fleet at El Callao – during the War of the Pacific, 1881
 Scuttling of the French fleet at Toulon – during the Second World War, 1942

References

Bibliography

External links 

 The scuttling at Scapa Flow
 Scapa Flow Wrecks

1919 in Scotland
History of Orkney
 
Maritime incidents in 1919
German High Seas Fleet at Scapa Flow
Military history of Scotland
Naval history of Germany
Military action involving Scottish islands
Aftermath of World War I in the United Kingdom
Aftermath of World War I in Germany